Nakoda is a census town in Chandrapur district in the Indian state of Maharashtra.

Demographics
 India census, Nakoda had a population of 5949. Males constitute 53% of the population and females 47%. Nakoda has an average literacy rate of 76%, higher than the national average of 59.5%: male literacy is 82%, and female literacy is 69%. In Nakoda, 11% of the population is under 6 years of age.

References

Villages in Chandrapur district